Setareh Eskandari (also Romanized as "Setāreh Eskandari", ; born June 15, 1974) is an Iranian stage, movie, and TV actress. She is mostly known for her parts in TV series since 1994, especially the TV series Narges, where she took the place of Poupak Goldareh as "Narges" after the latter’s unexpected death.
She has twice won the best actress award at Fajr International Theater Festival for her parts in the plays Unfortunate People’s Shaky Happiness (2000) and Co-aspiration (2014).

Life and career
Setareh Eskandari was born in 1974 in Torbat-e Heydarieh, Razavi Khorasan Province, northeastern Iran. A sophomore in English translation, she dropped out to pursue her acting career, and joined the students of The Faculty of Fine Arts in 1993. Eskandari appeared in students’ festivals for about six years, getting nominated for an award in 1995 for her part in the play Legend and two years later at Fajr International Theater Festival for her part in the play Earth’s Last Heroes.
Her movies include The Visitor to Rey (2000), Parya's Story (2010), Yousef (2010), Unplanned (2013), The Unwished (2016).

Eskandari’s debut as a professional stage actor was the play The Gold-Toothed (1999), directed by Davoud Mirbagheri, while she started playing in the stage group "Dey" under the management of Ali Rafiei, as well as taking parts on TV and in movies. Her debut as a movie actor was Rival of the Heart (1996), directed by Abdorreza Ganji.

She won Best Actress Award at the Fajr Theater Festival in 2001 for The Joy of Influencing the Lives of the Unfortunate.

Eskandari starred in the series The Gradual Death of a Dream (2006), Until Morning (2006), Factor 8 (2008) and Passion to Fly (2011).

Having directed two plays on TV, Eskandari has been also the producer of a number of plays, including The House of Bernarda Alba, directed by Ali Rafiei.

Awards 
 Best actress in 19th "Fajdr "festival 2001
 Best actress in "Iranian society of theater critics"  2001
 Best actress in 33rd "Fajdr" festival 2015 
 Best actress in "iran's house of Theater "  2015
 Two awards as best actress in TV 2006 and 2008 .

Television series
 Narges
 Majerahaye khneye shomare 13
 Ta Sobh
 Factor 8
 Marge tadrigiye yek roya
 Flying Passion
 Heyrani

Theatres
Dandoon Tala (Golden Teeth)
Romeo and Juliet
Shazdeh Ehtejab (Prince Ehtejab)
Divar (Te Wall)
Saadate Larzane Mardomane Tirerooz (won best actress in Fajr International Festival)
Ghahveye talkh (Dark Coffee)
Shabe hezaro yekom (The 1001st Night)
Dar mesr barf nemibarad (There is no snowing in the  Egypt)
Ashaghe
Eshgh va Alijenab (Love and His Excellency)
Shekare roobah (Hunting a Fox)
 Ham Havayea ( A mountain climbing term that means adaptation of body and height )

References

External links
Setareh Eskandari On Instagram

1974 births
Living people
Iranian film actresses
Iranian stage actresses
Iranian theatre directors
Iranian women film directors
Iranian television actresses
20th-century Iranian actresses
21st-century Iranian actresses
People from Razavi Khorasan Province